William George Saunders (born November 22, 1937) was a Canadian ice hockey forward who scored 425 goals, third on the WHL All-Time list.

Awards and achievements
Turnbull Cup MJHL Championships (1956 & 1957)
WHL Championships (1965 & 1971)
"Honoured Member" of the Manitoba Hockey Hall of Fame

External links

Billy Saunders’s biography at Manitoba Hockey Hall of Fame

1937 births
Living people
Canadian ice hockey forwards
Ice hockey people from Winnipeg
Winnipeg Monarchs players